This article lists some but by no means all of the oldest known minaret towers in the world.

The oldest minaret still surviving is that of the Great Mosque of Kairouan in Tunisia. It was constructed in 836 AD and is considered as the prototype for all the square shaped minarets built in the Western Muslim World.

Most ancient, surviving minarets were constructed adjacent to a mosque, for the Muslim call to prayer (Adhan) five times each day by a muezzin (crier). A few minarets were built as watchtowers, landmarks or symbols of victory or glory of a Muslim Khanate or empire. In some instances, like the Minaret of Jam only the minaret tower survives today while the adjoining mosques and other structures were destroyed over time by nature and invaders.

List of oldest minarets
This list ranks the oldest surviving minarets in the world. Only minarets built before 1900 AD. are included.

See also

Minaret
List of tallest minarets
List of tallest mosques
List of the oldest mosques

References 

Religion-related lists of superlatives
Mosques, oldest
Mosques, oldest
minarets